Protiv pravil (Against the Rules) is the fourth album by Russian singer-songwriter Dima Bilan, released by Мистерия Звука label on June 10, 2008 in Russia.

Track listing

DVD Track listing

References 

2008 albums
Dima Bilan albums